Chaetoderma is a speciose genus of aplacophoran mollusc. It has forty described species at present.

Species
 Chaetoderma abidjanense Scheltema, 1976
 Chaetoderma afanasjevi 
 Chaetoderma akkesiense
 Chaetoderma araucanae
 Chaetoderma argentum
 Chaetoderma bacillum
 Chaetoderma californicum
 Chaetoderma canadense
 Chaetoderma christikovi
 Chaetoderma elegans Scheltema, 1976Gistle worm
 Chaetoderma eruditum
 Chaetoderma glaciale
 Chaetoderma hancocki
 Chaetoderma hawaiiense
 Chaetoderma indicum
 Chaetoderma intermedium
 Chaetoderma japonicum
 Chaetoderma kafanovi
 Chaetoderma lucidum
 Chaetoderma luitfriedi
 Chaetoderma majusculum Scheltema, 1976
 Chaetoderma marinae
 Chaetoderma marinelli
 Chaetoderma marioni
 Chaetoderma marisjaponicum Saito & Salvini-Plawen, 2014
 Chaetoderma militare
 Chaetoderma nanulum
 Chaetoderma nitens
 Chaetoderma nitidulum
 Chaetoderma odhneri
 Chaetoderma orientale
 Chaetoderma pacificum
 Chaetoderma pellucidum
 Chaetoderma productum
 Chaetoderma recisum
 Chaetoderma robustum
 Chaetoderma salviniplaweni
 Chaetoderma scabrum
 Chaetoderma scheltemae
 Chaetoderma sibogae
 Chaetoderma simplex
 Chaetoderma squamosum
 Chaetoderma tetradens
 Chaetoderma usitatum Scheltema, 1976
 Chaetoderma vadorum1918

References

External links

 

Aplacophorans